is a railway station in Bibai, Hokkaidō, Japan.

Lines
Hokkaido Railway Company
Hakodate Main Line Station A16

Railway stations in Hokkaido Prefecture
Railway stations in Japan opened in 1891